"Rocky Ground" is a song written and recorded by American musician Bruce Springsteen. It is the second single from his album Wrecking Ball and was released exclusively in select stores as a limited-edition 7-inch 45-rpm vinyl single as a part of Record Store Day on April 21, 2012.

The song made its live debut on March 9, 2012, during Springsteen and the E Street Band's performance at the Apollo Theatre.

A music video for the song was first teased on Facebook and Twitter on May 24, 2012, and released the following day on May 25, 2012. The music video features the lyrics being written down on paper in sync with the song, interchanging this with a series of urban and suburban imagery.

On June 15, 2012, a video for the "Modern Mix" of the song was released. The remixed version was produced by Ron Aniello and Matthew Koma.

Rolling Stone named the song the 7th best song of 2012.

Lyrics and music
The song is heavy with a religious theme and features a gospel choir backing Springsteen. Singer Michelle Moore provides backing vocals along with rapping, a first for a Springsteen album. Springsteen has stated he originally attempted to do the rapping himself but was not satisfied with the sound.

"Rocky Ground" contains excerpts of "I'm a Soldier in the Army of the Lord", a traditional gospel song performed by Congregation of the Church of God in Christ and recorded by Alan Lomax in 1942.

Track listing
"Rocky Ground": 4:40
"The Promise (Bruce Springsteen and the E Street Band live from the Carousel, Asbury Park)": 5:59

Personnel

 Bruce Springsteen – lead vocal, guitars, percussion and loops
 Ron Aniello – drums and loops
 Art Baron – euphonium and tuba
 Clark Gayton – trombone
 Charlie Giordano – piano and organ
 Stan Harrison – clarinet, alto saxophone and tenor saxophone
 Dan Levine – alto horn and euphonium
 Ed Manion – tenor saxophone and baritone saxophone
 Michelle Moore – backing vocals and rapping
 Curt Ramm – trumpet and cornet
 Patti Scialfa – backing vocals
 Victorious Gospel Choir – backing vocals

References

External links
 Brucespringsteen.net

2012 songs
Bruce Springsteen songs
Songs written by Bruce Springsteen
Columbia Records singles
2012 singles
Song recordings produced by Ron Aniello
Song recordings produced by Bruce Springsteen